"(Let Me Be Your) Teddy Bear" is a popular song first recorded by Elvis Presley in 1957 for the soundtrack of his second motion picture, Loving You, during which Presley performs the song on screen. It was written by Kal Mann and Bernie Lowe and published in 1957 by Gladys Music.

Presley single 
The song was a U.S. No. 1 hit for during the summer of 1957, staying at No. 1 for seven weeks, the third of the four Presley had that year. "(Let Me Be Your) Teddy Bear" would also hit No. 1 on the R&B Best Sellers List, becoming his fourth No. 1 on that chart. The song also reached No. 1 on the country charts for a single week.

Track listing

Personnel 
Elvis Presley – lead vocal, percussion
Scotty Moore – lead guitar
Dudley Brooks, Hoyt Hawkins, or Gordon Stoker – piano
Bill Black – double bass
D.J. Fontana – drums
The Jordanaires – backing vocals
Walter Scharf – producer
Thorne Nogar – engineer

Cover versions 
 Shorty Mitchell With The Ken Jones Rock 'n' Rollers "(Let Me Be Your) Teddy Bear" and "All Shook Up" (Embassy single, 1957, UK, available on The Birth of British Rock, Frémeaux & Associés)
Barry Frank "(Let Me Be Your) Teddy Bear" and "I'm Gonna Sit Right Down and Write Myself a Letter" on Bell Records (1957)
Peter Kraus released a version in German titled "Teddybär" (1957)
Johnny Hallyday recorded a home demo version in French titled "Ton Petit Ours En Peluche" (1959)
Jerry Kennedy on his LP "Dancing Guitars Rock The Hits Of The King" (1962)
Pat Boone on his LP Pat Boone Sings Guess Who? (1963)
Laurel Aitken on his LP Scandal in a Brixton Market (1969)
Glen Campbell on his album Live at the Royal Festival Hall (1977)
Paul McCartney and Wings covered the song during one of their final recording sessions in November 1980. The track remains unreleased.
Angelyne on her album Angelyne (1982)
Mud on their album Les Grays Mud (1982)
Cliff Richard on his limited release album Rock 'n' Roll Silver (1983).
Tanya Tucker on the compilation It's Now or Never: The Tribute to Elvis (1994)
ZZ Top on their album XXX (1999)
Donna Loren on her EP Donna Does Elvis in Hawaii (2010)
The Residents on their album The King & Eye (1989)
João Penca e Seus Miquinhos Amestrados performs a Portuguese adaptation of the song, entitled "O Ursinho", in their album Os Maiores Sucessos de João Penca e Seus Miquinhos Amestrados (1983)
Take That with Mark Owen on lead vocal as a live performance (part of the "Rock 'N' Roll Medley") during their Everything Changes Tour (1993–1994)
The song was used in Full House and in the Disney special D-TV Romancin'.

References 

1957 singles
Elvis Presley songs
Glen Campbell songs
Songs with lyrics by Kal Mann
Songs written by Bernie Lowe
Billboard Top 100 number-one singles
1957 songs
RCA Records singles
Songs written for films
Teddy bears